Hayley Elizabeth Brock (born August 3, 1992) is an American soccer player. She played as a forward for Chicago Red Stars in 2014. Brock was injured in 2014 National Women's Soccer League season and did not return to play, instead she has returned to school.

References

External links
 
 Profile at soccerdonna.de 

1992 births
Living people
National Women's Soccer League players
Chicago Red Stars players
Penn State Nittany Lions women's soccer players
Maryland Terrapins women's soccer players
American women's soccer players
Chicago Red Stars draft picks
People from Acton, Massachusetts
Sportspeople from Middlesex County, Massachusetts
Soccer players from Massachusetts
Women's association football forwards
African-American women's soccer players
21st-century African-American sportspeople
21st-century African-American women